"The One with the Flashback" is the sixth episode of Friends third season. It first aired on the NBC network in the United States on October 31, 1996.

Plot
Janice asks the group if any of the six of them have almost slept with each other. The episode then flashes back.

Three years earlier, Phoebe is tired of roommate Monica's obsession with cleanliness, so she moves out of their apartment a little at a time. Monica does not notice – Phoebe explains her missing things by saying she has taken them to get repaired; and Phoebe sneaks away at night and sneaks back in before Monica wakes.

One night, (exactly one year before the pilot) while hanging out at their favorite bar, Monica mentions to Chandler that the bar is closing down to make room for a coffee shop (which would later become Central Perk). While there, she sees old high school friend Rachel, celebrating her recent engagement to orthodontist Barry Farber with friends Betsy and Kiki. Rachel mentions to her friends that she wants to have "one last fling" with the next guy she sees. Chandler, overhearing this, throws a pool ball near her table and goes to pick it up; but she ignores him. Monica and Rachel briefly catch up and promise to have lunch the next time Rachel is in the city. Later while driving back, Rachel fantasizes about making out with Chandler in the empty bar.

Chandler is looking for a new roommate after his previous one, Kip, gets married and moves out. He has been doing several interviews and has two more candidates – a photographer and Joey, an Italian-American actor. When the photographer, Eric, mentions that there may be models in the apartment and that his sister is a porn star, Chandler immediately jumps at the chance for the guy to move in, and rushes through his interview with Joey, whom Monica has a crush on.

However, when Eric comes to move in, the girls' downstairs neighbor Mr. Heckles claims he is Chandler's new roommate. Thinking Eric was a no-show, Chandler lets Joey move in with him. As Joey is moving in, he and Monica flirt, and she invites him in for a glass of lemonade. Joey, however, believes she wants to have sex with him, so he strips naked before she gives him his lemonade. After realizing she did not want sex after all, he apologizes and hurriedly dresses. Things get worse for Monica when she is cleaning and notices Phoebe's bed is gone. Phoebe then finally admits she has moved out, because she needs to "live in a land where people can spill" but hopes that they can still remain friends.

Monica is sad that Phoebe moved out, and wonders why she does not have a boyfriend. Chandler tells her she should have a boyfriend, and offers a hug. He says she is one of his favorite people, and the most beautiful woman he knows in real life. He convinces her that she will find someone, and they hug tenderly for a while until he diffuses the tension by asking about the fabric of Monica's towel. He then goes back to his place to watch Baywatch with new roommate Joey.

Ross is glad that his wife, Carol, has finally made a friend – a woman she met at the gym named Susan. It does not take Ross long to realize that Carol likes Susan as more than "just a friend". Late at night in the empty bar, he mourns over the end of his marriage; Phoebe consoles him and they start making out. They almost have sex on the pool table in the bar, but Ross hits his head on the light above the table, then his foot gets stuck in a pocket, then the pool balls get in the way. They decide that sleeping together would not solve anything, and are content to just remain friends. The rest of the gang walk in and Chandler introduces Joey to Ross.

Reception
In the original broadcast, the episode was viewed by 23.3 million viewers.

Sam Ashurst from Digital Spy ranked the episode #46 on their ranking of the 236 Friends episodes.

Telegraph & Argus also ranked the episode #46 on their ranking of all 236 Friends episodes.

References

1996 American television episodes
Friends (season 3) episodes